The Kunsthalle zu Kiel is an art museum in the German city of Kiel. With 2,000 m2 of display space, it is the largest museum in the city. It is north of the city centre on Düsternbrooker Weg. It has a lecture hall, a small cafe and a sculpture garden.

Building
The institution was founded in 1903 by Lotte Hegewisch of Christian-Albrechts-Universität zu Kiel to house an art gallery. Designed by Georg Lohr, the building was constructed between 1908 and 1909, opening on 14 November 1909 by Carl Neumann, chairman of the Schleswig-Holsteinischer Kunstverein, founded in 1843. It has a shell limestone facade in the Neo-Baroque and Jugendstil styles. In front of the entrance are two bison sculptures by August Gaul.

In the 1950s a new staircase was added, followed by an extension in 1986. In 2012 a re-design of the entrance hall was completed.

Collections
The museum houses the Schleswig-Holsteinischen Kunstverein's collection, including objets d'art, photographs, video art, sculptures and paintings. Topics covered include 19th century Romanticism, the Russian 'Wandermaler' painters, German Expressionism, German Impressionism and international art since 1945. The building also houses the Antikensammlung Kiel, founded in 1895 and consisting of ancient sculptures and a collection of casts of classical sculptures, the latter having been founded in 1838. The Antikensammlung is attached to the university. Much of the original collection was destroyed in World War Two air raids.

Provenance Research 
In July 2018 the Kunsthalle zu Kiel published a provenance research dossier on 85 paintings and 9 sculptures.

Gallery

List of directors
 1971–1990: Jens Christian Jensen
 1992–2000: Hans-Werner Schmidt
 2002–2009: Dirk Luckow
 2010–present: Anette Hüsch

Bibliography 
 Dirk Luckow (ed.): Kunsthalle zu Kiel. DuMont, Köln 2007,  
 Hans Tintelnot: Die Kunsthalle zu Kiel. Zur Geschichte eines Museumsbaus. Nordelbingen 1960 
 Jens Christian Jensen (ed.) 100 Jahre Kieler Woche - Lyonel Feininger: Gemälde, Aquarelle und Zeichnungen, Druckgraphik. Verlag: Kunsthalle zu Kiel der Christian-Albrechts-Universität, Kiel 1982

References

External links 
 http://www.kunsthalle-kiel.de
 http://www.antikensammlung-kiel.de
 

Museums in Kiel